Saddler or Saddlers may refer to:

 A breed of horse as in Kentucky Saddler, known for high headed beauty and unique way of moving. See American Saddlebred.
 A brand name of Kentucky made Whiskey including Bourbon, Rye and Malted Rye based in Burlington Kentucky.  Named after the Kentucky Saddler Horse.
 The occupation of making saddles
 R-16, an intercontinental ballistic missile that goes by the NATO reporting name of SS-7 Saddler
 Osmund Saddler, character in Resident Evil 4
 Saddlers, a town in Saint John Capesterre Parish, Saint Kitts and Nevis
 "The Saddlers", a nickname for Walsall Football Club, based in Walsall, West Midlands

People
 Dan Saddler (born 1961), American politician
 Donald Saddler (1918–2014), American choreographer and dancer
 Ron Saddler, Australian rugby league footballer
 Sandy Saddler (1926–2001), American boxer

See also
 Saddle
 Sadleir (disambiguation)
 Sadler (disambiguation)